The Bell UH-1N Twin Huey is a medium military helicopter designed and produced by the American aerospace manufacturer Bell Helicopter. It is a member of the extensive Huey family, the initial version was the CUH-1N Twin Huey (later CH-135 Twin Huey), which was first ordered by the Canadian Forces in 1968.

Barely a year following initial discussions, the UH-1N performed its maiden flight in April 1969. Its procurement by the US military was initially controversial due to the high level of Canadian content, such as its Pratt & Whitney Canada PT6T turboshaft engines. However, the acquisition was approved and the Twin Huey was quickly delivered to the United States Air Force and being sent to front line combat units in Vietnam in October 1970. During the following year, the Canadian Forces, United States Marine Corps, and the United States Navy all received their first examples; Bell was also quick to adapt the Twin Huey into a civilian helicopter, the Bell 212, as well as the later Bell 412.

The Twin Huey would see service in numerous conflicts, the first being the Vietnam War, where they were commonly used to support Special Forces reconnaissance missions. On the home front, they were used as the main utility helicopter at various ICBM launch sites, as well as operating as executive transports for carrying the US president and other high-ranking officials by Marine Helicopter Squadron One. USMC UH-1Ns were active during the 2003 invasion of Iraq, providing reconnaissance, communications, and close air support to ground forces. Overseas, UH-1Ns participated in the Colombian armed conflict and the Falklands War. In the 2010s and 2020s, multiple operators were in the process of replacing the Twin Huey with newer helicopters, such as the Bell UH-1Y Venom (a development of the UH-1N) and the AgustaWestland AW139.

Development
The UH-1N was originally developed out of negotiations between the Canadian Forces (CF) and Bell Helicopter on the topic of a new utility helicopter during 1968. Specifically, the CF wanted it to be based on the stretched-fuselage Bell 205, which the service already had experience of, but instead powered by a pair of engines for a higher level of safety. Furthermore, the selection of this engine, the Pratt & Whitney Canada PT6T turboshaft engine, was reportedly due to political factors. Its initial designation was CUH-1N Twin Huey; later, the CF adopted a new designation system under which the rotorcraft was redesignated CH-135 Twin Huey. The CF approved the development of the rotorcraft on 1 May 1968, a total of 50 CH-135s were procured, the deliveries of which commenced during May 1971.

The US military quickly took an interest in the UH-1N and some officials were keen to quickly procure the type, yet the procurement came close to not happening. It was opposed by the chairman of the House Armed Services Committee at the time, L. Mendel Rivers, who disliked that the UH-1N's Pratt & Whitney Canada PT6T engines were produced in Canada. The Liberal Canadian government of the time had not supported US involvement in Vietnam and had also opposed US policies in Southeast Asia, as well as accepted US draft dodgers. Rivers was also concerned that procuring the engines would result in a trade deficit situation with Canada. Congress only approved the Twin Huey purchase when it was assured that a US source would be found for the PT6T/T400 engines. As a result, the United States military services ordered 294 Bell 212s under the designation UH-1N, with deliveries commencing in 1970.

Having secured multiple military customers, Bell Helicopters became interested in developing a commercial utility model for the civilian market; during 1971, type certification was given to the Bell 212 by the Federal Aviation Administration (FAA). Later on, homologation was obtained for instrument flight rules (IFR) operations, for which appropriate avionics were fitted. During 1977, the company certified the Bell 212 for single-pilot IFR operations, making it the first helicopter in the world to obtain such certification. Another key opportunity was the European market; Bell negotiated with the Italian helicopter manufacturer Agusta to produce the AB-212 under license. This model, the first examples of which was delivered in 1971, was broadly the same as their American-built counterparts, and were produced for both civilian and military operators. During 1976, the AB-212ASW, an anti-submarine warfare-orientated model, commenced production.

The Bell 412 is a further development of the Bell 212, the major difference being the composite four-blade main rotor. The UH-1N has also been developed into the upgraded, four-blade UH-1Y, which was developed to replace the UH-1N in USMC service.

Design
The Bell UH-1N Twin Huey is a twin-engined medium-sized military helicopter primarily operated a utility transport. Power is provided by a PT6T-3/T400 Turbo Twin Pac, comprising a pair of Pratt & Whitney Canada PT6 turboshaft engines mounted side by side and driving a shared gearbox and single output shaft. These engines are capable of producing up to 1,342 kW (1,800 shp). In the event of a single power section failing, the remaining section can deliver 671 kW (900 shp) for up to 30 minutes or 571 kW (765 shp), enabling the UH-1N to maintain cruise performance at maximum weight. It is capable of flight under instrument flight rules and in nighttime conditions.

The UH-1N is often flown with a four-person crew, comprising two pilots and two crew chiefs; while in the air, these crew chiefs man the weapons, while one pilot functions as a navigator and the other actively flies. The interior is normally outfitted with a 15-seat configuration, in which it can be flown by a single pilot and carry up to 14 passengers; in practice, rarely could the UH-1N actually carry this many unless also carrying limited fuel and equipment due to weight limitations and weather conditions. When configured to carry cargo, the cabin has an internal capacity of 220 ft³ (6.23 m³). Up to six litters can be carried in a medical evacuation arrangement. An external load of up to 5,000 lb (2,268 kg) can also be carried. In United States Marine Corps (USMC) service, up to three radios would be installed in the cabin so that commanders could remain airborne while coordinating ground troops. The UH-1N was normally armed with a single .50 caliber machine gun on the helicopter's left side, while a 7.62 millimeter machine gun is mounted on the right side.

To improve safety, a high level of redundancy is present across the UH-1N's key systems; these include duplicate hydraulic, electrical, and fuel systems. Fire suppression systems were also installed. The USMC opted to modify a large number of their UH-1Ns with a stability control augmentation system, which provides servo inputs to the rotor head to help stabilize the aircraft during flight. This modification removed the gyroscopic "stabilization bar" on top of the main rotor head, instead relying on the computer system for stability.

Operational history

Starting in late 1970, mere months after receiving its first deliveries of the type, the USAF begun to re-equip the 20th Special Operations Squadron in Vietnam with UH-1Ns, supplementing and eventually replacing the single-engined UH-1F and UH-1P. Armed with miniguns (or 40 mm grenade launchers) and rocket pods, and painted camouflage with no US markings and only a Green Hornet insignia, the UH-1N supported Special Forces reconnaissance missions from Cam Ranh Bay.

The first deliveries of the UH-1N to the U.S. Navy and USMC took place in 1971. In total, 205 UH-1Ns would be received, not including six VH-1N executive transports that were used to carry the US president and other high-ranking officials, operated by Marine Helicopter Squadron One. Unlike in the CF, in US service, the UH-1N retained the official name "Iroquois" from the single–engined UH-1 variants, although US service personnel refer to the aircraft as a "Huey" or "Twin Huey".

In Canadian service, the CH-135 Twin Huey was regularly used as a tactical transport, moving troops and equipment around the forward areas of a combat zone; medevac flights were also conducted. Further activities included VIP transport, search and rescue, and drug interdiction missions. CH-135s were deployed on multiple occasions to support United Nations peacekeeping missions in various regions, including Central America, Somalia, and Haiti.

The Argentine Air Force acquired eight Bell 212s during 1978. During the 1982 Falklands War, Argentina deployed a pair of Bell 212s to the airstrip at Goose Green where they performed general support duties, including the recovery of numerous downed pilots. By the end of the hostilities, both aircraft were still intact and flightworthy, but were captured and dismantled by the British troops.

USMC UH-1Ns were deployed during the 2003 invasion of Iraq; they were typically used to provide reconnaissance and communications support to ground troops. Multiple UH-1Ns were called upon to provide close air support during heavy fighting in the Battle of Nasiriyah. In comparison with the Bell AH-1 Cobra attack helicopter, the UH-1N had a wider field of fire with its weapons and thus played a useful role in close combat situations, commonly working in conjunction with Cobras.

The USAF employs UH-1Ns to fulfill its ICBM mission, providing a utility helicopter for transport between bases such as Minot AFB, Francis E. Warren AFB and Malmstrom AFB to missile launch sites in North Dakota, Montana, Wyoming, Nebraska, and Colorado. The UH-1N is also used by the 36th Rescue Squadron (36 RQS) at Fairchild AFB, Washington, for conducting search-and-rescue and medical evacuation missions, as well as the 459th Airlift Squadron based at Yokota Air Base in Japan.

In August 2013, the USAF said they were close to finalizing a plan to sustain and modernize their UH-1Ns for the next six to ten years. It was intended to address flight and safety mandates, investigate modest improvements in capabilities, and reduce capability gaps. While the UH-1N had become one of the oldest platforms operated by the service, retaining it was viewed as having "minimal risk". Fleet-wide upgrades included night vision-compatible cockpit lighting, crash-worthy seats for flight engineers, and installation of a terrain-awareness warning system and traffic collision-avoidance device. The USAF was also in the process of acquiring ex-USMC UH-1Ns, possibly involving as many as 26 helicopters to either add them to USAF's active fleet or keep them in reserve.

The UH-1N saw combat service in the Colombian armed conflict. On 16 October 2013, a UH-1N crashed in the northern La Guajira department in a FARC-dominated area.

The USMC planned to retire the UH-1N by September 2014 after 43 years of service. Marine Light Attack Helicopter Squadron 773 was the last Marine squadron operating the type, their last deployment occurring in 2013, when two helicopters sailed on a Royal Netherlands Navy ship for an African Partnership Station deployment. The UH-1N was replaced by the upgraded UH-1Y Venom; ten are remanufactured UH-1N airframes, after which the USMC decided to procure newly built airframes instead. By 2014, five unarmed HH-1Ns remained in use by the USMC until these were also replaced by UH-1Ys and retired in 2015, the only HH-1Ns remaining from 44 that were converted from 38 UH-1Ns and the six VH-1Ns. The final combat deployment of USMC UH-1Ns was to Afghanistan in 2010. The service retired the UH-1N during a "sundown ceremony" at Naval Air Station Joint Reserve Base New Orleans on 28 August 2014.

By March 2013, the USAF operated 62 UH-1N Twin Hueys, with 25 providing security at ICBM sites, 19 stationed at Joint Base Andrews to evacuate Washington-based government officials in emergencies, and 18 used for testing and training. Since most were purchased in 1969, the USAF had sought a replacement. The first requirements were issued in 2007, but the process was repeatedly delayed. On 24 September 2018, the USAF declared a Boeing/Leonardo submission of their MH-139 variant of the AgustaWestland AW139 the winner, beating out the Sikorsky/Lockheed Martin HH-60U Black Hawk and the Sierra Nevada Corporation upgraded UH-60L Force Hawk. Boeing was awarded an initial $375 million contract for four MH-139s, with 84 helicopters planned at a total $2.38 billion program cost. Initial deliveries are planned for 2021.

Variants

Canadian variants
CUH-1N Twin Huey
Original Canadian Armed Forces designation for the UH-1N utility transport helicopter.
CH-135 Twin Huey
Canadian version of the UH-1N. Canada purchased 50 CH-135s with deliveries starting in 1971. The aircraft were retired from the Canadian Forces starting in 1996 and struck off strength in December 1999. 41 of the surviving CH-135s were acquired by the US government in December 1999 and transferred to the National Army of Colombia and Colombian National Police. At least one CH-135 was destroyed in combat. 135135 was transferred to the Colombian National Police and flown by the Dirección Antinarcóticos (DIRAN). It was destroyed on the ground by FARC rebels on 18 January 2002, following an incident in which it was forced down by gunfire. Two CH-135s are on display in museums, one at the Canada Aviation Museum in Ottawa and one at the National Air Force Museum of Canada at CFB Trenton.

U.S. variants

UH-1N Iroquois
Initial production model, used by the USAF, USN, and USMC. Over the years, the primary operators, the USMC has developed a number of upgrades for the aircraft including improved avionics, defenses, and a FLIR turret. The USAF planned to replace their UH-1Ns with the Common Vertical Lift Support Platform to support the service's ICBM activities, but also examined a life extension for their current fleet.
VH-1N
VIP transport configuration
HH-1N
SAR variant.
UH-1Y Venom
A UH-1N replacement and upgrade as part of the H-1 upgrade program for the USMC, designed to coincide with a similar upgrade for the AH-1W attack helicopter to AH-1Z Viper standard, with common engines and other major systems.

Italian-built variants

Agusta-Bell AB 212
Civil or military utility transport version. Built under license in Italy by Agusta.
Agusta-Bell AB 212EW
Electronic warfare version for Turkey.
Agusta-Bell AB 212ASW
Anti-submarine warfare, anti-shipping version of the AB 212 helicopter, built under license in Italy by Agusta. Operated by the Italian Navy, Hellenic Navy and Islamic Republic of Iran Navy, Peru, Spain, Turkey, and Venezuela.

The AB 212ASW is a Model 212 Twin Huey with a prominent radome above the cockpit. Early production had a dome-shaped radome, while later production had a flatter "drum" radome. A left side winch is used for dipping the Bendix ASQ-18 sonar. Other changes include structural reinforcement for a gross weight of 11,197 lbs (5080 kg), ECM, shipboard deck tie-down attachments and corrosion protection. Armament is two Mk 44 or Mk 46 torpedoes or two depth charges in the ASW role and four AS.12 air-to-surface wire-guided missiles for the anti-shipping role.

Operators

 National Air Force of Angola

 Argentine Air Force
 7th Air Brigade - 1st Search and Rescue Squadron

 Austrian Air Force

 Royal Bahraini Air Force

 Bangladesh Air Force
9th Squadron "Scorpions" 

 Colombian Air Force
 Colombian Army
 Colombian Navy

 Hellenic Navy

 Guatemalan Air Force

 Islamic Republic of Iran Air Force
 Islamic Republic of Iran Navy
 
 Lebanese Air Force 7 aircraft

 Italian Air Force operates 36 aircraft
 Italian Navy

 Mexican Air Force

 Royal Moroccan Air Force

 National Aeronaval Service

 Peruvian Air Force
 Peruvian Navy

 Philippine Air Force

 Royal Saudi Air Force

 Spanish Army
 Spanish Navy

 Sri Lanka Air Force

 Sudan Air Force

 Royal Thai Army
 Royal Thai Navy

 Tunisian Air Force

 Turkish Navy

 Army Air Corps

 United States Air Force

 Uruguayan Air Force

 Venezuelan Navy

Yemeni Air Force

Zambian Air Force

Former operators

 Royal Brunei Air Force

 Canadian Forces
403 Helicopter Operational Training Squadron
408 Tactical Helicopter Squadron
422 Tactical Helicopter Squadron
424 Transport & Rescue Squadron
427 Tactical Helicopter Squadron
430 Tactical Helicopter Squadron
444 Combat Support Squadron
VU 32 - pre-Unification Royal Canadian Navy Utility Squadron
Aerospace Engineering Test Establishment
Base Flight Cold Lake
Base Rescue Goose Bay

Guyana Defence Force

Israeli Air Force 

Jamaica Defence Force 

Republic of Singapore Air Force

 United States Marine Corps 
United States Navy

Aircraft on display
 Battleship Memorial Park, Mobile, Alabama, U.S.
 CH-135 135114 - Canada Aviation and Space Museum, Ottawa, Ontario, Canada
 CH-135 135102 - National Air Force Museum of Canada
 UH-1N 159198 – Flying Leatherneck Aviation Museum at MCAS Miramar, San Diego, California.

Specifications (USMC UH-1N, as modified)

Gallery

See also

References

Citations

Bibliography
 Chant, Christopher. Fighting Helicopters of the 20th Century. Graham Beehag Books, Christchurch, Dorset, England, 1996.
 Debay, Yves. Combat Helicopters. France: Histoire & Collections, 1996.
 Drendel, Lou. Huey. Squadron/Signal Publications, Carrollton, Texas, 1983. .
 Eden, Paul. "Bell 212/412". Encyclopedia of Modern Military Aircraft. London: Amber Books, 2004. .
 Francillon, Rene, J. Vietnam: The War in the Air, New York: Arch Cape Press, 1987.
 Frawley, Gerard. The International Directory of Military Aircraft, Aerospace Publications Pty Ltd, 2002. .
 Green, William. Observers Aircraft, Frederick Warne Publishing, 1980. .
 Hoyle, Craig. "World Air Forces Directory". Flight International, Vol. 182, No. 5370. pp. 40–64. ISSN 0015-3710.
 Mesko, Jim, Airmobile:  The Helicopter War in Vietnam. Squadron Signal Publications, 1984.
 Mutza, Wayne. "Covertly to Cambodia". Air Enthusiast, Thirty-two, December 1986–April 1987. pp. 22–31. ISSN 0143-5450.
 Mutza, Wayne. UH-1 Huey in action. Carrollton, TX: Squadron/Signal Publications, 1986. .
 Mutza, Wayne. UH-1 Huey in Colors. Carrollton, TX: Squadron/Signal Publications, 1992. .
 Shaw, Robbie: Superbase 18 Cold Lake- Canada's Northern Guardians, Osprey Publishing, London, 1990. 
 Specifications for 204, 205 and 214 Huey Plus
 Wood, Derek. Jane's World Aircraft Recognition Handbook, Jane's Publishing Company 1985. .

External links

 UH-1N page and UH-1 Huey history page on US Navy site
 UH-1N Huey fact sheet on USAF site
 The Bell UH-1N Huey at Greg Goebel's AIR VECTORS

UH-1N
1960s United States military utility aircraft
Search and rescue helicopters
1960s United States helicopters
Twin-turbine helicopters
Aircraft first flown in 1969
H-001Y, N